Miller & Beal, Inc., was a prominent architectural firm based in Portland, Maine, established in 1929. It was the successor to Miller, Mayo & Beal. Architect Lester I. Beal led the office.

History
The office was established in 1929, as Miller & Beal, when Raymond J. Mayo withdrew from the firm of Miller, Mayo & Beal. Lester Beal had worked for Mayo and William R. Miller since 1906, when the firm was based in Lewiston. The senior partner, William Miller, died on December 14, 1929, but Beal continued the office as Miller & Beal, Inc.

In the late 1950s Beal added Joseph DePeter and Ernest F. Spaulding as partners, with the firm becoming known as Beal, DePeter, Spaulding. He retired soon afterward, in 1960. After his 1966 death, the firm became Beal, DePeter, Ward with Edwin Corrigan Ward.

Architectural works

Miller & Beal, 1929

Miller & Beal, Inc., 1929-1950s

Beal, DePeter, Spaulding, 1950s-1966

Beal, DePeter, Spaulding, from 1966

Gallery

References

Architecture firms based in Maine